The Interprovincial Council of Santander, Palencia and Burgos was a governing body established on 8 February 1937 to coordinate the Republican areas in Cantabria (then officially called the Province of Santander), Palencia and Burgos during the Spanish Civil War. The council was dissolved in August 1937 after the occupation of the region by Nationalist forces.

Creation of the Interprovincial Council 

With the outbreak of war in July 1936, Cantabria and the northern parts of Palencia and Burgos remained under Republican control, as well as the neighboring Asturias and Biscay, while most of Castilla feel under nationalist rule. On 27 July, a "War Committee" was formed to direct the war effort, while the "Santander Defense Council" was in charge of directing the regional government.

On 23 December, the government of the Spanish Republic decided to create three Interprovincial Councils to replace the Defense Councils in Asturias and León, Santander, Palencia and Burgos, and Aragon. Following this order of the central government, the Interprovincial Council of Santander, Palencia and Burgos was officially constituted on 8 February 1937.

The government of the Republic delegated to the Council all functions except those of law enforcement, press and radio censorship, as well as meetings and public demonstrations. Among other functions, the Council assisted refugees from neighboring provinces, evacuated children and refugees, provided food and weapons, and minted its own currency.

Composition of the Interprovincial Council 
Following the guidelines of the Government of the Republic that determined that the number of councilors was double that of the provincial deputies,  The Interprovincial Council was made up of fourteen members, two of them from the Spanish Socialist Workers' Party (PSOE), two from Mountain Workers Federation-General Union of Workers (FOM-UGT), two from the Republican Left (IR), two from the National Confederation of Labor (CNT), two from the Communist Party of Spain (PCE), one from the Unified Socialist Youth (JSU), one from the Federal Democratic Republican Party (PRD Fed.), one from the Republican Union (UR) and one from the Iberian Anarchist Federation (FAI). This composition resulted in six Socialists, four Republicans, three Anarchists and two Communists, of whom four belonged to the trade unions. 

On 10 February 1937, the distribution of portfolios of the council was published in the Official Gazette of the Province:

End of Council 

The end of the Interprovincial Council came with the military setbacks of the republican forces in the summer of 1937. The last agreements made during those days corresponded to a request for arms for the defense of the region and food with which to alleviate the situation of the population, aggravated by the arrival of refugees from the nationalist-occupied areas.

With the fall of Santander on 26 August 1937 and the evacuation of the authorities to Asturias, the council was dissolved.

See also 
 Regional Defence Council of Aragon
 Sovereign Council of Asturias and León

References

Bibliography

Spanish Civil War
History of Cantabria
States and territories established in 1937
States and territories disestablished in 1937
Organisations of the Spanish Civil War
Spanish Revolution of 1936
Anti-fascist organisations in Spain
1937 establishments in Spain